D. minutus  may refer to:
 Dendrophryniscus minutus, a toad species found in Bolivia, Brazil, Colombia, Ecuador, French Guiana, Guyana, Peru, Suriname and possibly Venezuela
 Dendropsophus minutus, the lesser treefrog or ranita amarilla común, a frog species found in Argentina, Bolivia, Brazil, Colombia, Ecuador, French Guiana, Guyana, Paraguay, Peru, Suriname, Trinidad and Tobago, Uruguay and Venezuela

See also
 Minuta